Hatamabad (also Romanized as Ḩātamābād; also known as Ḩātamābād-e Gol Gol) is a village in Mirbag-e Shomali Rural District, in the Central District of Delfan County, Lorestan Province, Iran. At the 2006 census, its population was 81, in 14 families.

References 

Towns and villages in Delfan County